Coerney is a river and railway station 64 km north of Gqeberha, on the route to Rosmead, situated in the Sundays River Valley in Sarah Baartman District Municipality. Recorded as early as 1752 (in a journal of A.F. Beutler), the name is derived from Khoekhoen and means 'narrow (not "small") forest'. Formerly also known as Hoender Craal, from Dutch parelhoender, 'guinea-fowl'.

References

Populated places in the Sunday's River Valley Local Municipality